Wades Branch is a stream in Hickman County, Tennessee, in the United States.

Wades Branch was named for Robert Wade, who purchased the land on the creek in 1828.

See also
List of rivers of Tennessee

References

Rivers of Hickman County, Tennessee
Rivers of Tennessee